Pandora Spire is a sharply pointed feature, 1,670 m, the highest in the Solitary Rocks, on the north side of Taylor Glacier in Victoria Land. Named by the New Zealand Geological Survey Antarctic Expedition (NZGSAE), 1957–58.

Rock formations of Victoria Land
McMurdo Dry Valleys